Austromegabalanus is a genus of giant barnacles. It contains both extant and extinct species.

Species
Austromegabalanus carrioli Collareta et al., 2019
Austromegabalanus cylindricus (Gmelin, 1780)
Austromegabalanus isolde (Holthius & Silvertsen, 1967)
Austromegabalanus nigrescens (Lamarck, 1818)
†Austromegabalanus piscoensis Carriol et al., 1987 
Austromegabalanus psittacus (Molina, 1788)
†Austromegabalanus victoriensis Buckeridge, 1983 
Austromegabalanus zulloi Newman, 1979

References

Newman, W. A., 1979 On the biogeography of Balanomorph barnacles of the southern ocean including new balanid taxa a subfamily, two genera and three species, sér. 137, vol. 1, p. 279-306

Barnacles